Virtual CFO (or vCFO for short) stands for virtual chief financial officer. A virtual CFO is an outsourced service provider offering high skill assistance in financial requirements of an organization, just like a chief financial officer does for large organizations. A virtual CFO may be a single person or an entity. 

It's the equivalent of hiring a financial director on the side. Virtual CFOs are especially advantageous for small organizations that may not have the financial resources to engage a full-time CFO, but would benefit from having an experienced financial professional in charge of their finance department.

Virtual CFOs can undertake a variety of finance-related duties that many founders and business owners lack the abilities to handle, including as budgeting, identifying market trends, obtaining money, and preparing financial forecasts. Because virtual Chief Financial Officers are frequently hired by smaller start-ups, they'll be expected to handle some of the more fundamental financial chores like bookkeeping and reconciliation.

Target market 

The mushrooming of the startup ecosystem has generated specialized service providers which fit the requirement of startups. Virtual CFO is one such specialized service provider. Startups normally do not have the resources to hire a full-time CFO. Startups like to keep fixed costs low, and having an outsourced service provider provides them with the flexibility of choosing services as and when required. A Virtual CFO provides strategic, value add services to a startup which cannot be provided by an accountant. In the United States, VCFO services are typically used by small to medium businesses with annual sales in excess of $1 million.

Services offered 
The primary role of a chief financial officer in any organization is to oversee the financial planning, maintain and report on the financial activities, and manage financial risk of the business. A virtual CFO provides the same services but since the common clientele of a virtual CFO are small businesses and startups, there are certain more services that are expected of them. Services offered by a virtual CFO often follow the financial pyramid of needs. In the basic level, a virtual CFO is expected to be the bookkeeper of the client and has to take responsibility for the accuracy of the account books and interpret the financial information from the accounting data to the client. They make take responsibility for executing or overseeing the reporting process. On the more strategic side, they are the financial and strategic sparring partner from the CEO. They are also responsible for suggesting measures to control expenditure and acquire capital at low cost.

Practice 

Small companies may need a controller on a weekly or fortnightly basis. Virtual CFOs also offer one-time help with strategic transactions, financial processes, business plans and budgeting.

In the USA, Virtual CFOs earn between $55 and $250 an hour, as per their level of expertise. Clients are invoiced on an hourly or monthly rate depending on the nature of service. Most firms provide tailor-made services and the service charges vary from client to client 

In India, this practice is gaining ground, with a thriving start-up and SME culture in the country. This sector has discovered new virtual CFO companies in the last three to four years, mainly because the start-ups want to focus in their core areas, leaving the technical job to technical people.

In Germany, virtual or part-time CFOs (in German called "Teilzeit-CFOs") are getting more and more traction especially with startups, even though many SMEs still rely mostly only on their tax advisors, who have a good knowledge of German tax laws, but lack management and operational expierence.

However, this practice should be differentiated from finance outsourcing. Finance outsourcing is commonly understood to indicate a transnational outsourcing process, in which financial management of companies is generally outsourced from Western countries to low-wage group countries, like India, South Africa, Brazil, etc.

Professional qualifications 

There is currently no official requirement as to the qualifications that a virtual CFO should hold. However, it is generally expected for a virtual CFO to have finance related university degree, professional accountancy qualification and sufficient relevant experience.

In addition, virtual CFOs can obtain the Qualified Cloud CFO (QCCFO) professional certification provided by the International Association of Qualified Cloud Accountants (IAQCA) that is specifically focused on the knowledge that financial professionals need to deliver their services within the Internet and Cloud environment.

References 

Chief financial officers
Management occupations
Outsourcing